Derek Charles Moore-Brabazon, 2nd Baron Brabazon of Tara  (24 December 1910 – 11 December 1974), succeeded the title Baron Brabazon of Tara in 1964 on the death of his father, John Cuthbert Moore-Brabazon, 1st Baron Brabazon of Tara, carrying it for just ten years until his death in 1974.

Life
He was educated at Harrow School and Trinity College, Cambridge. An active Conservative, he was a councillor in Kensington, 1948–56, Chairman of the South Kensington Conservative Association 1952–54 and chairman of London Conservative Union, 1957–58. After the end of his tenure, he was appointed to the Order of the British Empire as a Commander (CBE) in the 1960 New Year Honours for "political and public services in London".

Family
In 1939, Moore-Brabazon married Henrietta Mary Clegg who died in 1985. Their son, Ivon, succeeded his father in 1974.

References

1910 births
1974 deaths
People educated at Harrow School
Alumni of Trinity College, Cambridge
2
Conservative Party (UK) hereditary peers
Members of Kensington Metropolitan Borough Council
Commanders of the Order of the British Empire
Derek